State Route 212 (SR 212) is a  state highway in Lake County in the northwestern portion of the U.S. state of Tennessee. It provides access to the Tennessee Department of Correction's Northwest Correctional Complex.

Route description
SR 212 begins in Tiptonville city limits, (but north of downtown) at an intersection with SR 22. It travels to the west to an entrance to the Northwest Correctional Complex and then, at a steep curve, it turns south. Then, at another steep curve, it turns back west and travels in front of the Northwest Correctional Complex. At a three-way intersection, SR 212 turns south again and continues southerly until it meets its eastern terminus, an intersection with SR 78 northeast of Tiptonville.

Major intersections

See also
 
 
 List of state routes in Tennessee

References

212
Transportation in Lake County, Tennessee